Mount Randall is a mountain rising to 3,000 m at the south end of Hackerman Ridge in the Victory Mountains, Victoria Land. The mountain, which forms the summit area in this part of the ridge, is 2 nautical miles (3.7 km) west of Mount Riddolls and 3.5 nautical miles (6 km) northeast of Mount Burrill, with which this name is associated. Named by the Advisory Committee on Antarctic Names (US-ACAN) in 1994 after Richard R. Randall, geographer and cartographer, Executive Secretary, U.S. Board on Geographic Names, 1973–93, whose office included responsibility for geographic nomenclature in Antarctica. Succeeding Meredith F. Burrill (after whom Mount Burrill was named) as Executive Secretary, Randall combined with Burrill to direct a half-century of American geographic names research.

Mountains of Victoria Land
Borchgrevink Coast